JMF may refer to:

 Java Media Framework, software
 Joe Montana Football, an American football video game
 John Moriarty Football, an organisation supporting Indigenous Australian footballers
 Juan Manuel Fangio, an Argentinian race car driver
 June Mar Fajardo, a Filipino basketball player
 Royal Johor Military Force, a military unit in Malaysia